Wolfgang, Count of Hohenlohe-Weikersheim (14 June 1546 in Waldenburg – 28 March 1610 in Weikersheim) was the first Count of Hohenlohe-Weikersheim.  He was the son of Louis Casimir of Hohenlohe-Waldenburg, who styled himself Count of Neuenstein, Langenburg, Weikersheim, Künzelsau, Kirchberg and Ingelfingen and his wife, Anna of Solms-Lich.

Early life 
Two of his brothers, Philip and Albert had served in the Nassau's army in 1572. Via his marriage with Magdalena of Nassau-Dillenburg, Wolfgang was also involved in the Eighty Years' War, although details of his involvement are scarce.

 
Wolfgang is best known for his reconstruction of Weikersheim Castle (Schloss Weikersheim) into a Renaissance palace. The new palace was designed by the Dutch architect Georg Robin. It was located in the Weikersheim part of the County of Hohenlohe, which Wolfgang had received when the county was divided after his father's death. He was interested in chemistry and his alchemical laboratory can still be seen there.

Marriage and issue 
In 1567, Wolfgang married Magdalena of Nassau-Dillenburg, a younger sister of William the Silent.  Wolfgang and Magdalena had the following children:
 Catherine (1567-1615)
 Anna Agnes (2 September 1568 – 8 September 1616), married Philip Ernest of Gleichen-Tonna (d. 1619), the Count of Gleichen, Tonna, Spiegelberg and Pyrmont.  He was the son of Count George of Gleichen-Tonna (d. 1570) and Countess Walpurga of Spiegelberg (d. 1599)
 George Frederick (5 September 1569 – 7 July 1645)
 Juliana (23 July 1571 – 8 March 1634), married Wolfgang II of Castell-Remlingen
 Magdalena (27 December 1572 – 2 April 1596), married Count Henry I of Reuss-Gera (10 June 1572 in Gera – 13 December 1635 in Gera).  He was the son of Count Henry XVI of Reuss-Gera (1530-1572) and his second wife Dorothea of Solms-Sonnewalde (1547-1595)
 Praxedis (1 May 1574 – 15 August 1633)
 Marta (29 April 1575 – 19 December 1632), married John Casimir of Leiningen-Westerburg (d. 1635)
 Maria Elisabeth (12 June 1575 – 31 January 1605), married Johann Reinhard I, Count of Hanau-Lichtenberg (13 February 1569 in Bitche – 19 November 1625 in Lichtenberg).  He was the son of Philip V, Count of Hanau-Lichtenberg and Ludowika Margaretha of Zweibrücken-Bitsch (19 July 1540 in Ingweiler – 15 December 1569 in Buchsweiler)
 Louis Casimir (4 February 1578 – 16 September 1604)
 Catherine Joanna (6 July 1579 – 28 November 1615)
 Crato VII (14 November 1582 – 11 October 1641), he married Countess Palatine Sophia of Zweibrücken-Birkenfeld, the daughter of Charles I, Count Palatine of Zweibrücken-Birkenfeld and Dorothea of Brunswick-Lüneburg
 Philip Ernest (11 August 1584 – 29 January 1628), married Anna Maria of Solms-Sonnewalde (14 January 1585 in Sonnewalde – 20 November 1634 in Ottweiler).  She was a daughter of Otto of Solms-Sonnewalde (25 June 1550 in Sonnewalde – 29 January 1612 in Sonnewalde) and Anna Amalia of Nassau-Weilburg (12 October 1560 in Weilburg – 6 January 1635 in Estrasburgo).  Anna Amalia was the eldest daughter of Albert, Count of Nassau-Weilburg.
 Albert (30 December 1585 – 21 October 1605)
 Wolfgang Ernest (11 August 1584 – 29 January 1588)
 Dorothea Walburga (20 September 1590 – 20 September 1656), married Philip Henry of Hohenlohe-Waldenburg (3 June 1591 in Waldenburg – 22 March 1644), who was Count of Hohenlohe-Waldenburg from 1615 until his death.  He was a son of George Frederick I of Hohenlohe-Waldenburg (1562-1660) and Dorothea Reuss of Plauen (1570-1631)

Ancestry

External links 
 Entry at geneall.net

Counts of Hohenlohe
House of Hohenlohe
1546 births
1610 deaths
16th-century German people
17th-century German people